Galactobacter caseinivorans is a Gram-positive and rod-shaped bacterium from the genus Galactobacter which has been isolated from raw cow milk from Germany.

References

Bacteria described in 2019
Micrococcaceae